Elvis Stojko,  (born March 22, 1972) is a Canadian figure skater. He was a three-time World champion (1994, 1995, 1997), two-time Olympic silver medallist (1994, 1998), and seven-time Canadian champion (1994, 1996–2000, and 2002).

Personal life
Stojko was born in Newmarket, Ontario, Canada to a Hungarian mother and Slovenian father and was named after Elvis Presley, of whom his parents were fans. His father arrived in Canada on a boat in 1955 and his mother, Irene, fled the Soviet invasion of Hungary in 1956. Stojko grew up in Richmond Hill, Ontario. There is a hockey arena named after him in Richmond Hill.

Stojko competed in the 2005 WKA Canadian Championships and placed first in the Chinese martial arts division. He has been involved with Ronald McDonald Children's Charities in Canada. He settled in Ajijic, Jalisco, Mexico in 2001. On June 20, 2010, he married Mexican figure skater Gladys Orozco in Las Vegas. They resided in Ajijic until June 2014, when they relocated to Toronto. They now live on 140 acres near Bowmanville.

On October 3, 2021, Stojko was revealed to have been named in the Pandora Papers by the CBC.

Career
Stojko began skating at the age of four and won his first trophy when he was eleven.

1990–91 to 1992–93
At the 1991 World Championships, Stojko became the first person to land a quadruple-double jump combination. He later said he had studied VHS tapes of Kurt Browning, Brian Boitano, Alexander Fadeyev, and Jozef Sabovčík to help him master the quad.

At the 1992 Winter Olympics in Albertville, he finished 7th despite skating a technically strong routine, but a month later he made his first appearance on a major international podium when he placed third at the 1992 World Championships behind winner Viktor Petrenko and Kurt Browning. In 1993 at the World Figure Skating Championships he finished second, once again behind Kurt Browning.

1993–94 season: Silver at Olympics and first World title
At the 1994 Canadian Championships in Edmonton, Stojko defeated Kurt Browning in the free skate to win his first national title. At the 1994 Winter Olympics in Norway at the Hamar Olympic Amphitheatre, he skated well enough in the short program to place second, putting him in good position heading into the free skate, after three of the pre-Olympic favourites (Brian Boitano, Viktor Petrenko & Kurt Browning) had disappointing short programs. Stojko had a strong performance in the free skate, despite popping a planned triple axel combination (which he later replaced by doing another triple Axel combination spontaneously) and won the silver medal. Stojko entered the 1994 World Championships in Chiba, Japan, as the favourite and won his first world championship with a performance that included another quadruple jump.

1994–95 season: Second World title
Stojko sustained a serious ankle injury during practice for the 1995 Canadian Championships, but was determined to compete anyway. He began his short program but was not able to complete it due to the injury, and was awarded a bye to the 1995 World Championships. His 1995 World Championship skate is regarded as one of his most impressive competitive outings because he completed his full routine despite his still-unhealed injury. Although in second place after the short programme behind American Todd Eldredge, Stojko won the free skate – and his second world championship – with a performance that included a triple lutz-triple toe loop combination in the closing seconds of his programme.

1995–96 season
At the 1996 World Championships in Edmonton, Alberta, Stojko fell on his triple axel combo jump, leaving him in seventh place after the short programme. In the free programme he included a quadruple jump combination (the only one in the competition) and moved him all the way up to fourth, just off the podium behind American Rudy Galindo, who won the bronze. His quadruple toe loop–triple toe loop was the first ever performed by a skater in a major competition.

1996–97 season: Champions Series title
Stojko won the 1996–97 Champions Series Final (Grand Prix Final) in Hamilton, Ontario, skating to the movie soundtrack of "Dragon Heart". Two other skaters also landed quad jumps during the free skate (Ilia Kulik and Alexei Urmanov), but not in combination as Stojko did.

At the 1997 World Championships, he again had a strong short programme and placed fourth going into the free. Approximately halfway through the free skate, Alexei Urmanov, leader after the short programme, withdrew from the event with an injury, while Ilia Kulik, in third, had a performance that put him out of contention. Stojko then took the ice and landed his quad-triple combination to earn two perfect scores of 6.0 and another world title.

1997–98 season: Silver at Nagano Olympics
Stojko entered the 1998 Winter Olympics in Nagano, Japan as the heavy favorite and was expected to become the first Canadian man to win an Olympic gold medal. He did not disclose to the media that he had suffered a groin injury and was also recovering from a flu that had struck many other athletes during the Games. He was unable to take painkillers due to the possibility of failing his drug test. He later stated in an interview that he was already feeling stiff and sore during the warm-up prior to the long program, and therefore downgraded his planned quadruple toe loop to a triple, likely costing him a chance at gold. Later in the programme, on the landing of a triple axel, Stojko aggravated the injury even further, saying he "felt something snap." He still managed to successfully complete four more triples after that point, and won the silver medal.

In February 1998, Stojko published a book, Heart and Soul, about his career.

1998–99 to 2001–02
Stojko finished fourth in the 1999 World Championships. After the 1998–99 season, Stojko changed coaches from Doug Leigh to Uschi Keszler and Tim Wood. He won silver at the 2000 World Championships.

Stojko placed eighth at the 2002 Winter Olympics in Salt Lake City. He turned professional in 2002.

He appeared as a hockey player Doug, in 2000's tv movie Ice Angel.

2003–present
Stojko was a commentator for CTV/TSN for the men's event at the 2003 World Championships in Washington, D.C. In 2006, he was a celebrity judge on the WE tv series Skating's Next Star, created and produced by Major League Figure Skating. The show was hosted by Kristi Yamaguchi.

Stojko briefly reinstated as an Olympic-eligible skater and publicly declared his intention to compete in the 2006 Olympics in Turin, Italy, before changing his mind and resuming his professional skating career. On August 10, 2006, he skated a farewell performance at a gala for the Mariposa skating club, where he trained most of his amateur career. He took a hiatus from active figure skating for several years.

Stojko provided commentary and analysis for Yahoo! Sports during the 2010 Winter Olympics in Vancouver, British Columbia, Canada. He wrote an article criticizing the figure skating judging system used during the 2010 Olympics, saying that it did not reward athletes for undertaking quadruple jumps.

Stojko participated in ISF Entertainment's acrobatic ice show, "A Rock & Roll Fantasy", in the July 2010 Calgary Stampede.

Since 2011, Stojko has been racing karts in the Canadian Rotax DD2 Master Class and the SKUSA Mexico Series (S1 and S4 classes).

After Stojko relocated back from Mexico to Canada, he resumed his show skating career. He has participated in the Canadian tour of Stars on Ice since 2016, the show skating events of the Canadian National Exhibition in Toronto, and Busch Gardens' Christmas Town events in Williamsburg, Virginia since 2015.

In 2016 Stojko played the role of Mercury in a TV-movie Ice Girls.

Stojko was named in the Pandora Papers in 2021.

Accomplishments
 Three-time World Figure skating champion: 1994, 1995, 1997
 Two-time Olympic Silver medallist: 1994, 1998
 Seven-time Canadian Figure skating champion: 1994, 1996, 1997, 1998, 1999, 2000, 2002
 Four Continents champion: 2000
 Grand Prix Final Champion: 1996/1997
 Winner of the Lionel Conacher Award: 1994
 First man to land a quadruple jump in combination (quadruple toe-loop, double toe-loop): 1991 World Championships
 First man to land a quadruple/triple jump combination (quadruple toe-loop, triple toe-loop): ISU Champions Series Final
 Inducted into the Canada's Sports Hall of Fame in 2006.
 Inducted into the Ontario Sports Hall of Fame in 2009.
 Inducted into the Canadian Olympic Hall of Fame in 2011.

Programs

Post-2002

Pre-2002

Results
GP: Champions Series / Grand Prix

See also
 List of Olympic medalists in figure skating

References

External links

 
 
 
 
 
 
 Meritorious Service Decorations Citations 
 Canoe.ca (2005). SLAM! Presents Elvis Stojko. Retrieved July 2, 2005.
 Brenda Gorman (2005). Stojko, Elvis . Retrieved July 2, 2005.

1972 births
Canadian male single skaters
Canadian people of Slovenian descent
Canadian people of Hungarian descent
Figure skaters at the 1992 Winter Olympics
Figure skaters at the 1994 Winter Olympics
Figure skaters at the 1998 Winter Olympics
Figure skaters at the 2002 Winter Olympics
Living people
Recipients of the Meritorious Service Decoration
Olympic figure skaters of Canada
Sportspeople from Newmarket, Ontario
Sportspeople from Richmond Hill, Ontario
Olympic silver medalists for Canada
Canadian male karateka
Olympic medalists in figure skating
World Figure Skating Championships medalists
Four Continents Figure Skating Championships medalists
Medalists at the 1998 Winter Olympics
Medalists at the 1994 Winter Olympics
People from Ajijic
People named in the Pandora Papers